Ieva Lucs is a Canadian actress and journalist. She is most noted for her regular role as Erica in the television series Good Dog, for which she was a Gemini Award nominee for Best Supporting Actress in a Comedy Series at the 26th Gemini Awards in 2011.

Career 
Lucs has acted primarily on stage, including in productions of Morwyn Brebner's The Pessimist, Theresa Rebeck's The Scene and Layne Coleman's Tijuana Cure, in which she portrayed both Coleman and Carole Corbeil.

She subsequently left acting, and joined the Canadian Broadcasting Corporation as a digital and radio journalist in Toronto and Kitchener.

Filmography

Film

Television

Video games

References

External links

21st-century Canadian actresses
21st-century Canadian journalists
Canadian television actresses
Canadian stage actresses
Canadian radio producers
Canadian radio journalists
Canadian women radio journalists
Living people
Year of birth missing (living people)
Women radio producers